The seventh season of the animated television series, Archer, premiered on FX on March 31, 2016. It was originally planned to consist of 13 episodes; however, it was later changed to 10.

Premise 

Following the ousting of the Isis employees from their CIA freelance work, everyone has relocated from New York to Los Angeles. Cyril Figgis, possessing a requisite law degree, has opened a boutique Private Investigation agency (The Cyril Figgis Agency) in Hollywood. Cyril’s authority is constantly undermined by everyone, and Mallory continues to assume the primary leadership role.

Though some of the season is episodic, a serial plot line is established early and is ultimately paid off in the two-part finale.

Whether Archer was going to continue beyond season-7 was unknown during the writing process, leading show runner Adam Reed to write a season finale that could have served as a conclusion for the series or a cliffhanger heading into season-8.

In June, 2016, FX announced it had renewed Archer for an additional three seasons, ensuring the show would continue through at least season 10.

Production 
The show's seventh season changes its setting from New York City to Los Angeles and follows the main characters as they run a private investigation agency in Hollywood.

While developing the season, the creative team took inspiration from Magnum, P.I. when writing the stories and they also used the series' location switch to change the series from the 1960s-aesthetic of prior seasons forward to 1970s-style, which included new clothing for the main characters.

The seventh season also marked the first time the show had a composer, J. G. Thirlwell, scoring the soundtrack for the season, a notable difference from previous seasons, in which only the opening and ending music themes were made by composers (Scott Sims and Mel Young, respectively), and the episodes used stock library music.

On February 1, 2016, a trailer for the show's seventh season was released. The trailer was a shot-for-shot remake of the opening scene of Magnum, P.I. Later that month, pictures of female Archer characters appeared in both the online and print versions of the 2016 Sports Illustrated Swimsuit Issue. On March 11, 2016, a new trailer for the show—a PSA in which Sterling and Lana instruct the audience at a movie theater to turn off their cell phones—began airing.

Following on from the successful scavenger hunt in Season 6, animator Mark Paterson devised an even more intricate hunt for Season 7, calling it "the most elaborate alternate reality game in television history" and including hidden clues or puzzles in every episode. It won the Primetime Emmy Award for Outstanding Interactive Program for 2016.

Episodes

Home media

References

External links
 
 

Archer (2009 TV series) seasons
2016 American television seasons